Joshua Burnside (born 11 July 1989) is a Northern Irish folk singer-songwriter based in Belfast.  His music incorporates elements of Irish folk, and Scottish folk rock, Americana, world music, sound collage and electronica. His debut album Ephrata was written in Colombia and incorporates Cumbian rhythms, as well as Colombian-inspired lyrical themes referencing the likes of Jaime Garzón. Ephrata was awarded the Northern Ireland Music Prize Best Album award in 2017.  Culture Northern Ireland have compared Burnside's musical style to that of Elliott Smith, Nick Drake, and Tom Waits, all of whom he has noted as personal inspirations.

Radio success

The three singles from Ephrata, "Blood Drive", "Tunnels, Pt. 2", and "Holllllogram", have had notable success on BBC 6 Music. Burnside's music has been featured on BBC 6 Music Recommends and received spot plays and praise from presenters Lauren Laverne, Guy Garvey, Steve Lamacq, and Tom Ravenscroft, as well as from BBC Radio 1 presenters Huw Stephens and Phil Taggart.

Nominations and notable appearances

In September 2018, Burnside's single "A Man of High Renown" from the EP All Round the Light Said was shortlisted for the Northern Ireland Music Prize Best Single.

He has performed at a number of international festivals including The Great Escape Festival, Other Voices, Reeperbahn Festival, and South by Southwest. Ahead of his first-ever appearances in America at South By Southwest in March 2018, "Holllllogram" attracted the attention of NPR.

Burnside was the Artist in Residence at the Cathedral Quarter Arts Festival 2018.  In this role, he opened for the likes of Bedouine, King Creosote, Shirley Collins, and This Is the Kit.

Discography

Albums

EPs

Singles

References

External links
 
 
 

1989 births
Living people
Folk singers from Northern Ireland